Strange People, Queer Notions is a 1958 novel by American writer Jack Vance,  writing as John Holbrook Vance. It was republished in the 2002 Vance Integral Edition (VIE).

Plot introduction
A young Oregonian art student is hired by another American to housesit a villa in a small Italian village. The employer then leads various members of the expatriate community in the village to believe the young man is a blackmailer.

Novels by Jack Vance
1958 American novels 
American mystery novels
Novels about artists
Novels set in Italy